Niedernsill is a town located in the Zell am See district in the state of Salzburg in Austria. It is best known for its winter sports of skiing and its summer activities of hiking.

Population

References

External links
Hotel guide to Niedernsill
Official website 

Cities and towns in Zell am See District
Kitzbühel Alps
Glockner Group